Henryville is an unincorporated community in Paradise Township, Monroe County, Pennsylvania, United States. Henryville is located by the intersection of Pennsylvania Route 191 and Pennsylvania Route 715.

Henryville has not been included in past Census counts.

On April 6, 1895, a small building used as sleeping quarters across from the Henryville House burnt down.

References

Unincorporated communities in Monroe County, Pennsylvania
Unincorporated communities in Pennsylvania